Miss Asia 1968 was the second edition of Miss Asia pageant which was held on December 8, 1968 at the Araneta Coliseum, Quezon City, Philippines. Macy Shih of Taiwan was crowned by the Miss Asia 1965 winner, Angela Filmer of Malaysia at the end of the contest. The pageant aims to promote tourism, peace, goodwill, credit and trading to the participating countries. Shih also received P10,000 (US$ 500) cash prize, a complete wardrobe, Asian cities tour, gifts ranging from camera to toothpaste. Her court each received P1,000 and prizes in kind.

Results

Special Awards

Judges 

 Guam Senator Earl Conway
 Andrew Gruber
 Alberto de Joya
 Israel Consul Benjamin Abileah
 R. A. Fairweather of the Canadian Embassay
 Kimiko Kuma of the Japanese Embassy
 Bertrand Rault of the French Embassy
 T. E. Colbrook of Australia
 Juan Quintos
 Mrs. Trinidad Enriquez
 Joe Quirino

Contestants 

  – Cassandra Stiles
  – Marlene Beverly Seneveratne
  – Sandra Cheung Siu-Ling
  – Annabella Crawford
  – Miriam Domkin
  – Atsumi Ikeno
  – Chang Hye-Sun
  – Sachie Kawamitsu
  – Jane Mozo de Goya
  – Violet Neo
  – Macy Shih
  – Valisra Trungvachirachi

Did not compete 

  – Maznah Mohamed Ali (she was not accepted by the organization to compete due to relations between Malaysia and the Philippines were suspended)

References

External links 

 Official website

1968 beauty pageants
1968